Volodymyr Okachev (born 16 May 1992 in Kharkiv) is a Ukrainian artistic gymnast.

Career 
Volodymyr Okachev won a bronze in senior team at the 2014 European Men's Artistic Gymnastics Championships.

References

Living people
1992 births
Ukrainian male artistic gymnasts
Sportspeople from Kharkiv
21st-century Ukrainian people